Albert Snider (October 22, 1921March 5, 1948) was a jockey in Thoroughbred racing who had success in his native Canada as well as the United States. He was born in Calgary, Alberta, and got his first win on September 1, 1938, at Stamford Park racetrack in Niagara Falls, Ontario.

Al Snider was riding in the southern United States in the latter part of 1938 where he quickly established a reputation as a capable rider. In the ensuing years he rode at major tracks in New York, Massachusetts, Rhode Island, Maryland Kentucky and Illinois. Among his significant wins were the Arlington-Washington Lassie Stakes and the Stars and Stripes Handicap. In his best finish in an American Classic, Snider rode owner Fred W. Hooper's colt Hoop Jr. to second place in the 1945 Preakness Stakes. He won the 1946 inaugural running of the Miss America Handicap with Hal Price Headley's Letmenow.

The Calumet years
Signed on to ride for Calumet Farm, Al Snider would become the jockey for future United States' Racing Hall of Fame inductee, Citation. He rode Citation in his career debut on April 22, 1947, winning a  furlong race at Havre de Grace Racetrack and most notably going on to win the Belmont Futurity Stakes en route to Citation being voted the U.S. Champion 2-Year-Old Colt. In all, Snider rode Citation five times at age two and four times at age three. He won all nine races.

Another of Snider's impressive wins in 1947 was aboard Fervent in the mile and three-sixteenths Pimlico Special. Run October 30 at Narragansett Park, stiff competition in the $25,000 winner-take-all race saw the field narrowed to four runners. In addition to Fervent, Calumet Farm also entered their best runner, Armed. Ridden by Douglas Dodson, bettors made Armed the 1-5 favorite in a year the future Hall of Fame gelding would be voted American Horse of the Year honors. The William G. Helis Sr. colt Cosmic Bomb had Ovie Scurlock aboard, Loyal Legion, owned by Walter M. Jeffords, was ridden by Eddie Arcaro.

In the space of two days in May 1947, Albert Snider guided three different horses to wins at Havre de Grace Racetrack in track record time. On two days during July at two racetracks in Chicago he rode two more horses to a track record time, one on turf and the other on dirt.

1948 promised to be a great year as Al Snider prepared to ride Citation in the U.S. Triple Crown series. At Hialeah Park Race Track, he rode the colt to victory in the 1948 Seminole and Everglades Handicaps. Then, after winning the Flamingo Stakes, on March 5 Snider used a day off to go fishing in the Florida Keys. While out on the water, a sudden storm came up and Al Snider apparently drowned. A search party found no trace of his body but reportedly found his skiff eight days later on an island 10 miles south of Everglades City.

Calumet Farms head trainer Ben Jones hired Eddie Arcaro to replace Snider on Citation and they won the Kentucky Derby, Preakness Stakes, and Belmont Stakes, making him only the eighth horse in history to win the U.S. Triple Crown. Calumet Farm and winning jockey Arcaro, one of Snider's friends, gave Snider's widow a share of his Kentucky Derby purse money.

In an extensive 1999 interview, Calumet Farm's Hall of Fame trainer Jimmy Jones spoke to Blood-Horse Publications about Albert Snider with "fondness and respect" saying such things as "Albert was a great rider, just as good as Eddie Arcaro", "Albert Rode Citation better than anybody", "he was a very intelligent rider, very polished", "he conducted himself like a professional", "with great work habits", "It was just a shame Albert couldn't have gone on with Citation to win the Triple Crown and Horse of the Year and all those races," and "Losing a fine young man like that when he was in his prime, well, it just made us all sick".

References

 "Man on a Horse". Time. (May 17, 1948).

1921 births
1948 deaths
Canadian jockeys
American jockeys
Sportspeople from Calgary
Accidental deaths in Florida
Deaths by drowning in the United States
Canadian emigrants to the United States